Lithuania's Strongest Man is an annual strongman contest held in Lithuania and features exclusively Lithuanian strength athletes. This competition has been held for the last 32 years. Zydrunas Savickas has won the title a record 16 times.

Results

References

External links
David Horne's World of Grip

National strongmen competitions
Sports competitions in Lithuania